Joshua Edward Poysden (born 8 August 1991) is a former English cricketer.  Poysden is a left-handed batsman who bowls leg breaks.  He was born in Shoreham-by-Sea, Sussex. He was educated at Cardinal Newman Catholic School, Hove and undertook further studies at Anglia Ruskin University.

While studying for his degree at Anglia Ruskin, Poysden made his first-class debut for Cambridge MCCU against Essex in 2011.  In this match, he took his maiden first-class wicket, that of Mark Pettini.  He made a further first-class appearance in the 2011 season, against Surrey.  Poysden scored 47 runs in Cambridge MCCU's first-innings, before being dismissed by Matthew Spriegel.  He also took three wickets in the match.

On 31 July 2015, Poysden took a catch to dismiss Mitchell Starc off the bowling of Moeen Ali while fielding as a substitute in the third Ashes Test match.

In August 2018, Poysden joined Yorkshire on loan for the remainder of the 2018 season before signing a three-year contract from the start of the 2019 season.

In July 2019, Poysden suffered a fractured skull during a training session, and was ruled out of the rest of the season.

References

External links

1991 births
Living people
People from Shoreham-by-Sea
Alumni of Anglia Ruskin University
English cricketers
Warwickshire cricketers
North v South cricketers
Yorkshire cricketers
Unicorns cricketers
Cambridge MCCU cricketers